The Parc régional du Mont-Ham (in English: Mont-Ham Regional Park) is a regional park highlighting Mont Ham, culminating at . The park is located in the municipality of Ham-Sud, in the Cantons-de-l'Est, in the Les Sources Regional County Municipality, in administrative region of Estrie, in Quebec, in Canada.

The renewed image of the park is inspired by the etymology of the name "waban-aki" (or "abenaki"), meaning "People of the rising sun". The aim is to put an Abenaki accent on it.

The park has given itself a mission to promote responsible and sustainable recreotourism.

Geography 
Mount Ham offers a 360-degree panoramic view of the Estrie.The park encompasses the area surrounding Mont Ham.

History 
The mont Ham obtained the status of regional park in 2014. It is the first regional park in the Cantons-de-l'Est tourist region.

Activities 
This park is open year round.

The Grand Council of the Waban-Aki Nation (GCNWA) and the MRC des Sources have carried out a promising project for their two communities which translates into four different components:
 development of the Espace Abénakis, a multifunctional space for interpreting the presence of this Nation on the territory;
 an Aboriginal-inspired accommodation sector;
 a mountain discovery trail;
 the development of educational tools to learn more about the Abenaki culture.

Toponym 
The toponym "Mont Ham Regional Park" is linked to the name of the mountain. This toponym was made official on November 27, 2015, at the Place Names Bank of the Commission de toponymie du Québec.

Notes and references

See also 
National Parks of Quebec

External links 
 Official site of Mont Ham
 Journal La Press et La Tribune, article "Le mont ham devient un parc régional".

Protected areas of Estrie
Important Bird Areas of Quebec
Les Sources Regional County Municipality
Regional Parks of Quebec
Nature reserves in Quebec